Ouvrage Saint Ours Bas is a lesser work (petit ouvrage) of the Maginot Line's Alpine extension, the Alpine Line.  The ouvrage consists of one infantry block. The location is unusual in lacking the underground galleries typical of a Maginot fortification, making it more like a blockhouse than an ouvrage. It was armed with two machine gun cloches and three heavy twin machine guns and six light machine gun embrasures. The interior is laid out on two levels. 

Construction began in July 1931, and cost 4.2 million francs to complete. The position controlled movement along RN 100.

See Fortified Sector of the Dauphiné for a broader discussion of the Dauphiné sector of the Alpine Line.

Present condition
Saint-Ours Bas has been preserved and is now a museum, associated with Ouvrage Saint Ours Haut, as part of the Museum of Saint-Ours-Bas.

See also
 List of Alpine Line ouvrages

References

Bibliography 
Allcorn, William. The Maginot Line 1928-45. Oxford: Osprey Publishing, 2003. 
Kaufmann, J.E. and Kaufmann, H.W. Fortress France: The Maginot Line and French Defenses in World War II, Stackpole Books, 2006. 
Kaufmann, J.E., Kaufmann, H.W., Jancovič-Potočnik, A. and Lang, P. The Maginot Line: History and Guide, Pen and Sword, 2011. 
Mary, Jean-Yves; Hohnadel, Alain; Sicard, Jacques. Hommes et Ouvrages de la Ligne Maginot, Tome 1. Paris, Histoire & Collections, 2001.  
Mary, Jean-Yves; Hohnadel, Alain; Sicard, Jacques. Hommes et Ouvrages de la Ligne Maginot, Tome 4 - La fortification alpine. Paris, Histoire & Collections, 2009.  
Mary, Jean-Yves; Hohnadel, Alain; Sicard, Jacques. Hommes et Ouvrages de la Ligne Maginot, Tome 5. Paris, Histoire & Collections, 2009.

External links 
 Saint-Ours (petit ouvrage bas) at fortiff.be 
 

BASO
Maginot Line
Alpine Line
World War II museums in France
Museums in Alpes-de-Haute-Provence